Mordechai "Pudi" Halfon is a former Israeli footballer who is mostly known for playing in Maccabi Netanya. He played for Netanya close to twenty years and won over 400 caps in all club competitions.

Honours
Israeli Premier League (3):
1977-78, 1979–80, 1982–83
Israel State Cup (1):
1978
League Cup (2):
1982–83, 1983–84
Israeli Supercup (3):
1978, 1980, 1983
UEFA Intertoto Cup (4):
1978, 1980, 1983, 1984
Liga Artzit (2):
1984-85, 1985–86

References

1957 births
Living people
Israeli Jews
Israeli footballers
Maccabi Netanya F.C. players
Liga Leumit players
Association football midfielders